Reading Street may refer to:

 Reading Street, Ashford, Kent, England, United Kingdom
 Reading Street, Thanet, Kent, England, United Kingdom